Kilburn is a village in the civil parish of Kilburn High and Low, in the Hambleton District in the county of North Yorkshire, England.

History

The village is mentioned in the Domesday Book of 1086 as "Chileburne" in the Yalestre hundred. At the time of the Norman invasion, the lord of the manor was Arnketil, but was subsequently granted to Hugh, son of Baldric. During the reign of Henry I the manor was passed to Rouen Cathedral in Normandy and subsequently to Roger de Mowbray who passed the lands to the Colvilles. In return for receiving these lands, Thomas de Colville had to swear allegiance to Roger de Mowbray. The Colvilles held the manor until 1405 when the eighth Thomas Colville was murdered outside York and died without male heirs. The lands were held by the Archbishop of York after the Dissolution of the Monasteries in the 16th century.

Kilburn was historically a township and parish in the wapentake of Birdforth in the North Riding of Yorkshire. After 1837 it was part of the Thirsk and Helmsley Poor Law Unions. The parish, which covered  acres, comprised Kilburn, Oldstead, Thorpe-le-Willows, and Wass, of which Kilburn had the largest population. The etymology of the name comes from two Old English words, ciele & burna, meaning "cool stream".

Robert de Alneto, a monk from Whitby Abbey, lived in a hermitage at Hood Grange,  from the village. In 1138 Robert de Mowbray converted it into a Cistercian abbey, which later moved to Old Byland and subsequently moved again to Byland.

Governance

The village lies within the Thirsk and Malton UK Parliament constituency. It also lies within the Stillington, North Yorkshire electoral division of North Yorkshire County Council and the White Horse ward of Hambleton District Council. The local Parish Council has five members.

Geography

The village consists of High Kilburn the former situated on a hillside and Low Kilburn in the valley on the banks of a stream. The nearest settlements are Wass  to the east; Coxwold  to the south-east; Carlton Husthwaite  to the south-west and Thirkleby  to the west. There was a sandstone-quarry at Hood Hill.

The 1881 UK Census recorded the population as 387. The 2001 UK Census recorded the population as 180, of which 162 were over sixteen years old and 84 of those were in employment. There were 105 dwellings of which 73 were detached. There are a total of 18 Grade II listed buildings in the area.

The village is known for the White Horse. The White Horse is a figure cut into the hillside to the north of the village, and visible for many miles around on a clear day.

Religion

There is a church in the village dedicated to St Mary. The Grade II* listed building was erected in the early 12th century and underwent restoration in 1869.

A Wesleyan chapel was built in the village in 1838.

Notable people

Robert Thompson, whose trade-name was "the Mouseman", lived in the village. He manufactured furniture in English oak mainly for church use. His work is distinguished by a carving of a mouse somewhere on the piece. Examples can be seen on the wooden candlesticks in Westminster Abbey. These pieces were commissioned directly by the widow of the captain of HMS Barham as a memorial to the lost ship and her crew.

References

External links

Villages in North Yorkshire
Hambleton District